Anne Camm (née Newby; August 1627 – 30 September 1705) was an early English Quaker preacher.

Life

Origins 
Anne Newby was born and baptised in Kendal in 1627. She became inspired by religion during a stay in London with her aunt for seven years.

First marriage 
Anne married John Audland and they were both preachers for the Quaker cause from their conversion in 1652. Anne travelled throughout Yorkshire, Oxfordshire, Leicestershire and Derbyshire advocating the views of George Fox. In 1653 she was put on trial for her blasphemy but argued that this was incorrect and she published her views in A True Declaration of the Suffering of the Innocent, two years later. Anne travelled without her husband so that she could avoid the distraction of pregnancies that might interfere with her work.

Second marriage 
In 1664 she gave birth to a son a fortnight after the death of her first husband. After this she married Thomas Camm despite being over a decade older than him. They had two daughters and Anne supported her husband in his preaching rather than preaching herself. She had to run the household whilst he was imprisoned for his beliefs. Anne's reduction in her preaching is thought to mirror the changing role of women within the Quakers. Frequently quiet, Anne reacted when she heard of opposition to Quaker women having meetings and the women Quakers in Kendal wrote letters in protest to the views of John Wilkinson and John Story.

Death 
She died in 1705.

References

1627 births
1705 deaths
People from Kendal
British women writers